Raymond Clare Edwards (August 2, 1920 – February 6, 2017) was a politician in Ontario, Canada. He served as a Liberal member of the Legislative Assembly of Ontario from 1959 to 1963 representing the Hamilton area riding of Wentworth.

Background
Edwards was born in Meyronne, Saskatchewan, a rural party of the southern province. His parents were Charles Raymond Edwards and Caroline Matilda Stribbell. He was a realtor and insurance agent. In 1941, he married Rita Miles and together they raised five children.

Politics
In the 1959 provincial election, Edwards ran as the Liberal candidate in the Hamilton area riding of Wentworth. He defeated Progressive Conservative incumbent Art Child by 944 votes. He served as a supporter of opposition party leader John Wintermeyer for the next four years. In the 1963 election, he was defeated by PC candidate Donald Ewen by 833 votes.

References

External links

1920 births
2017 deaths
Ontario Liberal Party MPPs
Politicians from Hamilton, Ontario